Armando Antonio Galarraga Barreto (born January 15, 1982) is a Venezuelan former professional baseball pitcher. Galarraga made his Major League Baseball (MLB) debut with the Texas Rangers on September 15, 2007. He was traded to the Detroit Tigers at the end of the 2007 season where he spent three seasons and also played in MLB for the Arizona Diamondbacks and Houston Astros. In 2010, Galarraga was one out from a perfect game when first base umpire Jim Joyce mistakenly called the runner safe.

Playing career

Texas Rangers
He originally signed as a free agent with the Montreal Expos on October 31, 1998. He was acquired by the Texas Rangers from the Washington Nationals as part of the deal that sent Alfonso Soriano to the Nationals in 2005.

Galarraga made his Major League debut on September 15, 2007 against the Oakland Athletics. He entered the game in the eighth inning, and pitched a scoreless inning. He allowed no hits and one base on balls.

Detroit Tigers

2008
On February 5, 2008, Galarraga was traded to the Detroit Tigers for Michael Hernandez, an outfielder that had spent the last season playing for the AA Erie SeaWolves.  As a minor league call up for the injured Dontrelle Willis, Galarraga earned his first career win April 16, 2008 in a 13–2 victory over the Cleveland Indians.

On June 13, 2008, Galarraga pitched seven shutout innings in a 5–0 victory over the Los Angeles Dodgers. He finished the 2008 campaign with a 13–7 record, a 3.73 earned run average (ERA), and 126 strikeouts in 178 innings.  When batters did hit the ball against him, they only managed a .237 batting average on balls in play, the lowest in the Major Leagues.  Galarraga threw sliders 38.9% of the time in 2008, more than any other starting pitcher in the majors.

After a superb rookie season, Galarraga finished fourth in the balloting for the 2008 American League Rookie of the Year Award.

2009
On April 10, 2009, Galarraga pitched the home opener at Comerica Park. Tigers manager Jim Leyland said Galarraga deserved to pitch Opening Day after having an impressive 2008 season. The Tigers won the game 15–2, which included a grand slam by Miguel Cabrera. On April 29, prior to a game against the New York Yankees, Galarraga received his 2008 Tigers Rookie of the Year award from the Detroit Sports Broadcasters Association.

Statistically, Galarraga did not approach the success he achieved in the 2008 season.  His 2009 ERA was a below average 5.64, and opposing batters hit a high .284 against him.

2010

In seven innings of work in spring training of 2010, Galarraga allowed nine runs, 14 hits and seven walks. That, coupled with his attitude ("They've seen my stuff; they know what I can do", Galarraga said during his ineffective spring training stint), prompted the Tigers to option him to the Tigers Triple-A affiliate Toledo on March 18, 2010. Galarraga was called up to the Tigers in May 2010 and was put into the starting rotation. He had an ERA of 4.50 as of June 1. Galarraga was optioned to Toledo on July 6, 2010 but Tigers GM Dave Dombrowski has said he would return on July 20 and start against Texas.  On July 19, the Tigers recalled Galarraga.

"The 28-out perfect game"

On June 2, 2010, Galarraga pitched 8 perfect innings, but the perfect game disappeared on the 27th batter after what was ruled an infield hit. Rookie Jason Donald hit a ground ball to first baseman Miguel Cabrera, who tossed to Galarraga—who was covering first base—but first base umpire Jim Joyce incorrectly called Donald safe, ending the perfect game and no-hitter. Galarraga retired the next batter, completing the one-hitter, though many in the Tiger press preferred to call it "the 28-out perfect game." Galarraga threw 88 pitches, 67 of them for strikes. If he had completed the perfect game (83 pitches), it would have been the lowest number of pitches thrown since Addie Joss's 74 in 1908, and the shortest game since Sandy Koufaxs perfect game in 1965. It would have been the second perfect game in the Major Leagues in just four days, Philadelphia's Roy Halladay having thrown his on May 29, and the third in 24 days (Dallas Braden of Oakland on May 9).

Joyce later issued a direct apology to Galarraga, saying that the call was incorrect. Galarraga accepted the mistake gracefully, saying later, "Nobody's perfect." Observers pointed to the handling of the situation as an example of good sportsmanship on both sides.  He was presented with a "Medal of Reasonableness" for his reasoned response to Joyce's call at the Rally to Restore Sanity and/or Fear.

Arizona Diamondbacks
During the 2010–11 offseason, Galarraga was designated for assignment by the Tigers. On January 24, 2011 he was traded to the Arizona Diamondbacks in exchange for pitchers Kevin Eichhorn and Ryan Robowski.

On May 17, 2011, Galarraga was designated for assignment and spent the rest of the season with the AAA Reno Aces After the 2011 season, he became a free agent.

Baltimore Orioles
Galarraga signed as a minor league free agent with the Baltimore Orioles on January 18, 2012. The Orioles released him on April 6.

Houston Astros
He signed a minor league contract as a free agent with the Houston Astros on May 21, 2012. He pitched in five games for the Astros between July 28 and August 19, losing four of them. Galarraga was designated for assignment on August 22 and released on August 25, 2012.

Cincinnati Reds
Galarraga signed a minor league contract with the Cincinnati Reds in January 2013.

Colorado Rockies
He was traded to the Colorado Rockies for Parker Frazier on July 15, 2013. He was assigned to AAA affiliate Colorado Springs Sky Sox.

Texas Rangers
In January 2014, Galarraga joined the Texas Rangers on a minor league deal. He was released on March 24.

Chinatrust Brother Elephants
Galarraga signed a contract with the Chinatrust Brother Elephants of Taiwan's Chinese Professional Baseball League in April 2014. He pitched 10 games and posted an ERA of 4.470. He was released by the club on July 5, 2014.

Pericos de Puebla
In 2015, Galarraga signed a contract with the Pericos de Puebla of the Mexican League.

In between, Galarraga played winter ball with the Leones del Caracas club of the Venezuelan League in parts of seven seasons spanning 2009–2014.

Galarraga retired from professional baseball in December 2015.

See also
 List of Major League Baseball players from Venezuela

References

External links

, or Retrosheet, or The Baseball Gauge, or Venezuela Winter League

1982 births
Living people
Arizona Diamondbacks players
Arizona League Rangers players
Bakersfield Blaze players
Brother Elephants players
Colorado Springs Sky Sox players
Detroit Tigers players
Frisco RoughRiders players
Gulf Coast Expos players
Harrisburg Senators players
Houston Astros players
Leones del Caracas players
Lexington Legends players
Louisville Bats players
Major League Baseball pitchers
Major League Baseball players from Venezuela
Mexican League baseball pitchers
Oklahoma City RedHawks players
Oklahoma RedHawks players
People from Cumaná
Pericos de Puebla players
Potomac Nationals players
Reno Aces players
Savannah Sand Gnats players
Spokane Indians players
Baseball players from Caracas
Texas Rangers players
Toledo Mud Hens players
Venezuelan expatriate baseball players in Mexico
Venezuelan expatriate baseball players in Taiwan
Venezuelan expatriate baseball players in the United States
World Baseball Classic players of Venezuela
2009 World Baseball Classic players